Kadriye is a village and resort in the District of Serik, Antalya Province, Turkey.

Kadriye is the first resort with beach park (Kadriye Beach Park), luxury golf hotels and theme park (The Land of Legends Kingdom), to have a golf course in Turkey. Turkey's first Golf Resort.

History
Municipality since 1994.

Geography
Kadriye; distance to Belek 8 km, distance to Serik 15 km, distance to Antalya Airport 20 km and distance to Antalya is 30 km.

Golf Clubs

 National Golf Club (27-Holes)
 Antalya Golf Club (36-Holes)
 Sueno Golf Club (36-Holes)
 Cullinan Links Golf Club (27-Holes,  ex. Titanic Golf Club)
 Carya Golf Club (18-Holes)
 Kaya Palazzo Golf Club (18-Holes)

Hotels

 Kempinski Hotel The Dome Belek
 Regnum Carya Golf & Spa Resort
 Titanic Deluxe Golf
 Cullinan Belek (Cullinan Golf & Resort Belek)
 The Land of Legends Kingdom Hotel (Rixos Hotels)
 TUI MAGIC LIFE Belek (ex: Asteria Club)
 Papillon Belvil
 Club Mega Saray
 TUI MAGIC LIFE CLUB Masmavi
 IC Santai Family Resort
 Aydinbey Queen's Palace & Spa
 Crystal Tat Beach Golf Resort & Spa
 Sueno Hotels Golf Belek
 Sueno Hotels Deluxe Belek
 Kaya Belek
 Kaya Palazzo Golf Resort
 Kaya Palazzo Mansions
 Sirene Hotel
 Innvista Hotel
 Green Max Hotel
 Altis Resort Hotel
 Bellis Deluxe
 Zeynep Resort Hotel
 Selectum Luxury Resort (Owned by Anex Tour) (ru, Official website Anex Tour).
 Maya World Hotels
 River Resort

References

External links

 Kadriye Information
 Kadriye Official Website

Antalya
Turkish Riviera
Villages in Serik District